Brackley Town Football Club is a football club in Brackley, Northamptonshire, England. The club won the FA Trophy in 2018.

History
Established in 1890, the club spent much of the pre-World War I era in the Oxfordshire Senior League. After the war they switched to the North Bucks & District League, where they remained until transferring to the Banbury & District League. However, they rejoined the North Bucks League in 1974. In 1977 the club joined Division One of the Hellenic League. They won the league's Knock-Out Cup in 1982–83, after which they switched to Division One of the United Counties League in 1983. They went on to win the division at the first attempt, earning promotion to the Premier Division. Although they finished as runners-up in 1988–89, the following season saw them finish twentieth, and after finishing bottom of the division in three successive seasons between 1991–92 and 1993–94, the club rejoined the Hellenic League and were placed in the Premier Division.

Although Brackley finished third-from-bottom of the Premier Division in their first season, the 1995–96 season saw them end the season as runners-up. The following season the club were league champions, earning promotion to Division One Midlands of the Southern League. After one season they were transferred to Division One South, but were relegated back to the Hellenic League at the end of the 1998–99 season, which saw them finish bottom of the division. In 2003–04 Brackley won the Hellenic League for a second time, as well as the Supplementary Cup, and were promoted back to the Southern League, this time to Division One West. A third-place finish in 2005–06 saw them qualify for the promotion play-offs. However, after beating Marlow 2–1 in the semi-finals, they lost 3–2 to Hemel Hempstead Town in the final. The club were transferred to Division One Midlands for the following season, and went on to win the division, earning promotion to the Premier Division. In 2008–09 they reached the first round of the FA Cup for the first time, losing 2–1 at Eastwood Town. After finishing fifth in 2009–10 the club qualified for the promotion play-offs again, but lost 6–0 to Nuneaton Town in the semi-finals.

The 2011–12 season saw Brackley win the Premier Division, earning promotion to the Conference North. They finished third in their first season in the division. In the subsequent promotion play-offs, they beat Altrincham 4–2 on aggregate in the semi-finals before losing 1–0 to FC Halifax Town in the final. The following season the club reached the first round of the FA Cup again, and after drawing 1–1 against Gillingham at Priestfield, they won the replay 1–0. In the second round the club lost 3–2 at Macclesfield Town. Brackley reached the first round again in 2015–16, losing 4–1 to Newport County in a replay after a 2–2 draw in the first match. The 2016–17 FA Cup saw the club reach the second round after again beating Gillingham 4–3 in a first-round replay. In the next round they lost 1–0 at Blackpool.

In 2017–18 Brackley won the FA Trophy, beating Bromley 5–4 on penalties in the final after the game had ended 1–1. They also finished third in the National League North and reached the play-off final after defeating Bradford Park Avenue 1–0 in the semi-finals, before losing 3–0 in the final to Harrogate Town. In 2020–21 the club reached the second round of the FA Cup again; after defeating Bishop's Stortford 3–2 on penalties after a 3–3 draw in the first round, they lost 1–0 at Tranmere Rovers in the second. In 2021–22 the club were runners-up in the National League North, subsequently losing 1–0 to York City in the play-off semi-finals.

Reserve team
The club's reserve team played in the Hellenic League between 2015 and 2020. They joined Division One East of the league in 2014 under the name Brackley Town Development. After finishing as runners-up in their first season, they were promoted to the Premier Division and were renamed Brackley Town Saints. The team left the league at the end of the 2019–20 season.

Ground

The club played at Manor Road from their establishment until 1968, when they moved to Buckingham Road, where the players changed in the nearby Plough pub. In 1974 they moved to St. James Park on Churchill Way. Floodlights were installed during the 1988–89 season. During their first spell in the Southern League a 300-seat stand was built on one touchline. The ground currently has a capacity of 3,500, of which 300 is seated and 1,500 covered.

Current squad

Men's team

Women's Team

Current staff

Management Board

Football Management

Honours 
FA Trophy
Winners 2017–18
Southern League
Premier Division champions 2011–12
Division One Midlands champions 2006–07
Hellenic League
Premier Division champions 1996–97, 2003–04
Knock-Out Cup winners 1982–83
Supplementary Cup winners 2003–04
United Counties League
Division One champions 1983–84
Northamptonshire Senior Cup
Winners 2010–11, 2011–12, 2014–15
Maunsell Cup
Winners 2011–12, 2012–13

Records
Highest league position: Second in the National League North, 2021–22
Best FA Cup performance: Second round, 2013–14, 2016–17, 2020–21
Best FA Trophy performance: Winners, 2017–18
Best FA Vase performance: Third round, 1987–88
Record attendance: 2,604 vs F.C. Halifax Town, 12 May 2013, Conference North play-off final
Most appearances: Glenn Walker
Most goals: Paul Warrington, 320
Record transfer fee received: £2,000 from Oxford City for Phil Mason, 1998

See also
Brackley Town F.C. players
Brackley Town F.C. managers

References

External links

 
Football clubs in England
Football clubs in Northamptonshire
Association football clubs established in 1890
1890 establishments in England
Oxfordshire Senior Football League
North Bucks & District Football League
Banbury District and Lord Jersey FA
Hellenic Football League
United Counties League
Southern Football League clubs
National League (English football) clubs
Brackley